Deer Island is one of the Fundy Islands in the Bay of Fundy, Canada. It is at the entrance to Passamaquoddy Bay. The island was first settled by colonists around 1770.

Local government was provided by the West Isles Local Service District, which is within the Southwest NB Regional Service Commission.

At 45 km2, it is the largest island in the West Isles Parish CSD, which had a 2021 population of 718. It has three communities: Fairhaven, Leonardville, and Lords Cove. There is a primary school on the island, while older pupils attend Fundy High School on the mainland.

The economy is primarily fishing and aquaculture based although tourism is growing. The Old Sow, the largest tidal whirlpool in the western hemisphere can be viewed from Deer Island Point Park.

The major route is New Brunswick Route 772. The year round L'Etete to Deer Island Ferries run by the government, Deer Island Princess II and Abnaki II, connect Deer Island with L'Etete, New Brunswick on the mainland. During the summer, privately operated ferries, through East Coast Ferries Ltd, operate the Cummings Cove to Welshpool Ferry, Hopper II, to Campobello Island. The Cummings Cove to Eastport Ferry, Fundy Trail II to Maine, has been defunct since 2014.
There are two lighthouses on Deer Island. One is in Leonardville and the second is located on Deer island point.

Gallery

References

External links

 Aids to Navigation Canadian Coast Guard

Canada–United States border crossings
Coastal islands of New Brunswick
Landforms of Charlotte County, New Brunswick
Communities in Charlotte County, New Brunswick
Parishes of Charlotte County, New Brunswick
Lighthouses in New Brunswick